Events in the year 2019 in Jordan.

Incumbents
 Monarch – Abdullah II 
 Prime Minister – Omar Razzaz

Events
13 June – Premiere of the television series Jinn

Sport
12 to 28 July – Jordan competed at the 2019 World Aquatics Championships in South Korea.

Deaths

26 April – Abdul-Latif Arabiyat, politician (b. 1932/1933).
14 August – Suleiman Bakhit, entrepreneur and comics writer (b. 1977/1978).
21 August – Dina bint Abdul-Hamid, princess, Queen consort (b. 1929).
31 October – Amjad Nasser, writer and poet (b. 1955).
9 November – Zaid Kilani, gynecologist (b. 1938).
26 November – Madiha Rashid Al-Madfai, radio broadcaster.

References

 
2010s in Jordan
Years of the 21st century in Jordan
Jordan
Jordan